Yoon Hyun (born April 5, 1966) is a South Korean judoka.

He won a silver medal in the extra lightweight division (– 70 kg), losing to Nazim Huseynov from Azerbaijan in the final in the 1992 Summer Olympics. Yoon also won two World Championship medals in 1989 and 1991.

External links
Database Olympics

Judoka at the 1992 Summer Olympics
Olympic judoka of South Korea
Olympic silver medalists for South Korea
Living people
1966 births
Olympic medalists in judo
South Korean male judoka
Medalists at the 1992 Summer Olympics
20th-century South Korean people